Choletbus is a network of urban and periurban buses in the city of Cholet, France. The network is operated on behalf of the Agglomeration community of Cholet by Transports Publics du Choletais.

The Choletbus network contains a total of eighteen bus lines, of which eleven form the central network that serves Cholet and seven other lines form a peri-urban network that serves the communes of the agglomeration. The entire network is made up of 250 different stopping points.

References

External links
Choletbus
Public transport mobility in Pays de la Loire

Bus companies of France
Transport in Cholet